The Dornier Do 29 was an experimental aircraft developed by Dornier Flugzeugwerke and the Deutsche Versuchsanstalt für Luftfahrt (German Aviation Laboratory) in the 1950s, used to test a tilting-propeller system for short takeoff and landing (STOL) aircraft. The concept was proved to be successful in flight testing; however, no further development of the system or aircraft was proceeded with, and at the conclusion of its test program the Do 29 was retired.

Design and development
During the Second World War, Heinrich Focke of Focke-Achgelis, a manufacturer of helicopters, developed a design for a short-takeoff-and-landing aircraft that would utilise a system of pusher propellers, one on each wing in a pusher configuration, to provide downward thrust and enhance lift. Designated Fa 269, the design was not developed due to the state of the war.

In the 1950s, however, a renewed interest in STOL and VTOL aircraft led to a re-evaluation of Focke's concept, and Dornier was given a contract to develop an aircraft capable of demonstrating the tilting-propeller system. The aircraft, given the designation Do 29, was based on the Do 27 light transport, modified with twin Lycoming GO-480 engines mounted below the wings. These engines drove three-bladed, pusher propellers, that were capable of being tilted downwards to an angle of up to 90 degrees, and the engines were coupled so that symmetrical thrust could be maintained in the event of an engine failure.

The forward fuselage was also modified with a helicopter-like cockpit.  A Martin-Baker ejection seat was provided for pilot escape in the event of an emergency.

Testing

Two examples of the Do 29 were constructed, while a third was planned but not built, with the first prototype flying on 12 December 1958.

Despite this, however, the tilting-propeller system was not further pursued after the end of the flight test program.

Aircraft on display
One of the Do 29 prototypes survived the program, and is displayed in the Dornier Museum in Germany.

Operators

Luftwaffe

Specifications (Do 29)

See also

References
Notes

Bibliography

 Winchester, Jim, ed. Aviation Factfile: Concept Aircraft. San Diego, CA: Thunder Bay Press.

External links

http://www.1000aircraftphotos.com/Contributions/Visschedijk/6709.htm

Do 029
1950s German experimental aircraft
Tiltrotor aircraft
Twin-engined pusher aircraft
High-wing aircraft
STOL aircraft
Aircraft first flown in 1958